The Cardiff Giant was one of the most famous archaeological hoaxes in American history. He covered the giant with a tent and it soon became an attraction site. Both it and an unauthorized copy made by P. T. Barnum are still being displayed. P.T. Barnum's is on display at Marvin's Marvelous Mechanical Museum in Farmington Hills, Michigan.

Creation and discovery
The giant was the creation of a New York tobacconist named George Hull. He was deeply attracted to science and especially in the theory of evolution proposed by Charles Darwin. Hull, an atheist, got into an argument with Reverend Turk and his supporters at a Methodist revival meeting about Genesis 6:4, which states that there were giants who once lived on Earth. Being the minority party, Hull lost the argument. Angered by his defeat and the credulity of people, Hull wanted to prove how easily he could fool people with a fake giant.

The idea of a petrified man did not originate with Hull, however. During 1858, the newspaper Alta California had published a fake letter claiming that a prospector had been petrified when he had drunk a liquid within a geode. Some other newspapers also had published stories of supposedly petrified people.

In 1868, Hull, accompanied by a man named H.B. Martin, hired men to quarry out a  block of gypsum in Fort Dodge, Iowa, telling them it was intended for a monument to Abraham Lincoln in New York. He shipped the block to Edward Burghardt in Chicago, a German stonecutter who he had sworn to secrecy. Burghardt hired two sculptors named Henry Salle and Fred Mohrmann to create the giant. They had taken cautious steps to cover up their work during the carving, putting up quilts to lessen the sound of carving.

The giant was designed to imitate the form of Hull himself. Hull consulted a geologist and learned that hairs wouldn't be petrified, so he removed the hair and beard from the giant. The length of the giant was 10 feet 4½ inches and it weighed 2990 pounds.

Various stains and acids were used to make the giant appear to be old and weathered. In order for the giant to look ancient, Hull first wiped the giant using a sponge soaked with sand and water. The giant's surface was beaten with steel knitting needles embedded in a board to simulate pores. The giant was also rubbed with sulphuric acid to create a deeper, vintage-like color. During November 1868, Hull transported the giant by railroad to the farm of his cousin, William Newell. By then, he had spent  for the hoax.

On a night in late November 1868, the giant was buried in a hole in Newell's farm. Nearly a year later, Newell hired Gideon Emmons and Henry Nichols, ostensibly to dig a well, and on October 16, 1869, they found the giant. One of the men reportedly exclaimed, "I declare, some old Indian has been buried here!"

Exhibition and exposure as fraud
On the first day, the audiences were able to view the giant with no fee charged. The next day, a tent was set up on the discovery site and Newell charged each audience fifty cents for a fifteen-minute session of visiting the giant. The number of audiences went to about three to five hundreds per day as the demand for wagons and carriages dramatically increased. The townspeople also gained huge profit because of the Cardiff Giant. The hotels and restaurants in Cardiff saw more customers in those four days than they had ever seen before.

Some believed this giant was a petrified man, while some believed it was a statue. Those who believed it was a petrified man thought it was one of the giants mentioned in the aforementioned Genesis verse. On the other hand, John F. Boynton, the first geologist to examine the giant, declared that it could not be a fossilized man, but hypothesized that it was a statue that was carved by a French Jesuit in the 16th or 17th century in order to impress the local Native Americans.

Andrew D. White, the first president of Cornell University, made a close inspection of the Cardiff Giant. He noticed that there was no good reason to try to dig a well in the exact spot the giant had been found.“Being asked my opinion, my answer was that the whole matter was undoubtedly a hoax; that there was no reason why the farmer should dig a well in the spot where the figure was found; that it was convenient neither to the house nor to the barn; that there was already a good spring and a stream of water running conveniently to both; that, as to the figure itself, it certainly could not have been carved by any prehistoric race, since no part of it showed the characteristics of any such early work; that, rude as it was, it betrayed the qualities of a modern performance of a low order.”However, he was taken aback by the channels on the bottom part of the giant, stating that for such grooving to be created on local Onondaga grey limestone would require years.

Yale paleontologist Othniel C. Marsh examined the statue, pointed out that it was made of soluble gypsum, which, had it been buried in its blanket of wet earth for centuries, would not still have fresh tool marks on it (which it did), and termed it "a most decided humbug". Some theologians and preachers, however, defended its authenticity.

They moved it to Syracuse, New York, for exhibition. The giant drew such crowds that showman P. T. Barnum offered $50,000 for the giant. When the syndicate refused, he hired a man to model the giant's shape covertly in wax and create a plaster replica. He displayed his giant in New York, claiming that his was the real giant, and the Cardiff Giant was a fake.

As the newspapers reported Barnum's version of the story, David Hannum was quoted as saying, "There's a sucker born every minute" in reference to spectators paying to see Barnum's giant. Since then, the quotation has often been misattributed to Barnum himself.

Hannum sued Barnum for calling his giant a fake, but the judge told him to get his giant to swear on his own genuineness in court if he wanted a favorable injunction.

On December 10, 1869, Hull confessed everything to the press, and on February 2, 1870, both giants were revealed as fakes in court; the judge also ruled that Barnum could not be sued for terming a fake giant a fake. Hull proclaimed that he did not confess because of the pressing criticism, but confessed proudly that he intended for the hoax to be exposed to reveal the tendency of the Christian community to believe in things too easily and to counter the fundamentalist belief that giants once roamed the earth.

Subsequent and current resting places
The Cardiff Giant was displayed at the 1901 Pan-American Exposition, but did not attract much attention.

Iowa publisher Gardner Cowles, Jr., bought it later to adorn his basement rumpus room as a coffee table and conversation piece. In 1947 he sold it to the Farmers' Museum in Cooperstown, New York, where it is still displayed.

The owner of Marvin's Marvelous Mechanical Museum, a coin-operated game arcade and museum of oddities in Farmington Hills, Michigan, has said that the replica displayed there is Barnum's replica.

A replica of the Giant is displayed at The Fort Museum and Frontier Village in Fort Dodge, Iowa.

Imitators
The Cardiff Giant has inspired a number of similar hoaxes.
 In 1876, the Solid Muldoon was exhibited in Beulah, Colorado, at 50 cents a ticket. There was also a rumor that Barnum had offered to buy it for $20,000. One employer later revealed that this was also a creation of George Hull, aided by Willian Conant. The Solid Muldoon was made of clay, ground bones, meat, rock dust, and plaster.
 In 1879, the owner of a hotel at what is now Taughannock Falls State Park hired men to create a fake petrified man and place it where workmen would dig it up. One of the men who had buried the giant later revealed the truth when drunk.
 During 1897, a petrified man found downriver from Fort Benton, Montana, was claimed by promoters to be the remains of former territorial governor and U.S. Civil War General Thomas Francis Meagher. Meagher had drowned in the Missouri River during 1867. The petrified man was displayed across Montana as a novelty and exhibited in New York and Chicago.

In popular culture 
 In Halt and Catch Fire, the fictional Cardiff Giant personal computer was named after the petrified man.
 "Cardiff Giant" is a song on the 2012 album Ten Stories by the band mewithoutYou.
 Inspired the story "The Capitoline Venus" by Mark Twain
 The ghost of the Cardiff Giant is a character in the short story titled "A Ghost Story."
 The Cardiff Giant was referenced in the short story "Out of the Aeons" by H.P. Lovecraft and Hazel Heald.
 The podcast The Memory Palace did an episode about the Cardiff Giant.
 A character called the Cardiff Giant appeared occasionally in the early years of the newspaper comic Alley Oop. He was larger than the other cavemen, had a pale beard, and spots over his torso and arms.
 The Cardiff Giant was referenced in the Babylon Five novel "The Shadow Within" by Jeanne Cavelos.

See also 
 Pompey stone
 Nampa figurine

References
Notes

Bibliography
 

Further reading

External links

 P.T. Barnum Never Did Say...
 Photo of "discovery" site
 US Library of Congress photo of the giant
 Cardiff Giant Hoax Recreated By Syracuse Artist Ty Marshal

1868 sculptures
1869 archaeological discoveries
19th-century hoaxes
Archaeological forgeries
Hoaxes in science
Hoaxes in the United States
Sideshow attractions